is a Japanese professor.

His public domain LZSS implementation from 1989 is used in many products. He also worked on an adding an arithmetic-encoding step to form LZARI, the precursor to LZH.

References 

Living people
Year of birth missing (living people)